NBCA may refer to:

 Narrow Burst Cutting Area
 National Basketball Coaches Association, union representing NBA coaches
 National Biodiversity Conservation Area
 n-Butyl cyanoacrylate
 New Braunfels Christian Academy
 New Brunswick Court of Appeal
 New Brunswick Curling Association
 Nuneaton and Bedworth Community Association